Jeremy MacKenzie (born 1985 or 1986) is a Canadian right-wing activist, military veteran, Plaid Army podcaster, the founder of far-right group Diagolon, and a Canada convoy protester.

Interests and views 
MacKenzie is a right-wing activist who founded the alt-right group Diagolon. He is a firearms enthusiast and a Plaid Army podcaster.

MacKenzie has stated that there is a race war occurring in the US, and has described the Nuremberg Trials as a kangaroo court.

Career and activism 
MacKenzie joined for the Canadian Armed Forces in 2003 and worked as infantryman for the Royal Canadian Regiment, which included a deployment in Afghanistan.

MacKenzie is present on many social media platforms where he uses variations of the username Raging Dissident.

Canada convoy protest and activism 

In early 2022, MacKenzie took part in the Canada convoy protest. In February 2022, he was identified by Public Safety Minister Marco Mendicino as a national security risk; Mendicino also identified MacKenzie's Diagolon organization as "a far right extreme organization."

While giving evidence at the subsequent Public Order Emergency Commission, MacKenzie downplayed his connections to Chris Lysak, one of the men accused of plotting to kill police officers at the 2022 bridge blockage, close to Coutts, Alberta. MacKenzie's lawyer had previously requested that MacKenzie be allowed to participate in the commission in private, without the public watching. Commissioner Paul Rouleau rejected evidence presented by MacKenzie that downplayed the role of Diagolon at the protest and described Diagolon's presence at both the Ottawa and Coutts protests as "the most troubling connection between protest locations" in his concluding report.

Allegations and arrest 
The Royal Canadian Mounted Police (RCMP) issued a Canada-wide arrest warrant for MacKenzie in July 2022, and he was arrested on September 29, 2022 in Cole Harbour, Nova Scotia. MacKenzie was charged with crimes in three provinces, including Saskatchewan and Nova Scotia. His charges include: criminal harassment, uttering threats, assault, pointing a firearm at someone, and ten counts of possessing restricted firearms and prohibited magazines. He was denied bail on the October 7, 2022. MacKenzie fired his lawyer on the October 13, 2022. After being held in Saskatoon Provincial Correctional Centre, he was granted bail on November 25, 2022.

MacKenzie made racist comments and discussed raping Anaida Galindo (wife of Conservative Party leader Pierre Poilievre) with podcast guest with Alex Vriend, prompting Poilievre to ask the RCMP to investigate him. An RCMP investigation was ongoing as of October 2022.

Personal life 
MacKenzie was aged 36 in 2022. He moved to Pictou, Nova Scotia in December 2021.

References 

1980s births
Living people
Alt-right
Organization founders
Far-right politics in Canada
Canadian podcasters
Canadian conspiracy theorists
People from Pictou County
Protesters involved in the Canada convoy protest